The following outline is provided as an overview of and topical guide to ergonomics:

Ergonomics – study of designing equipment and devices that fit the human body, its movements, and its cognitive abilities.

Branches of ergonomics 
Engineering Psychology
Macroergonomics
Seating Ergonomics

History of ergonomics

General ergonomics concepts 
Aesthetics
Comfort
Ease of use
Performance management
Productivity
Safety
Ergonomic Hazards

Ergonomics scholars 
 Frederick Winslow Taylor
 Wojciech Jastrzębowski

See also 
Ergonomics in Canada
Rohmert's law

External links 

 Human Factors and Ergonomics resources
NIOSH Topic Page on Ergonomics and Musculoskeletal Disorders

Ergonomics
Ergonomics